E3 ubiquitin-protein ligase MIB1 is an enzyme that in humans is encoded by the MIB1 gene. It is involved in regulating apoptosis.

Confusion with proliferative marker
An antibody directed at the protein Ki-67, a product of the MKI67 gene, is called MIB-1.

References

Further reading